This is a list of British television related events from 1997.

Events

January
1 January 
ITV introduces a third weekly episode of Emmerdale.
2 January – Test transmissions begin for Channel 5 in some areas. Details of them are made available on Ceefax page 698 for a few weeks.
3 January – The final episode in the second run of the game show Celebrity Squares, presented by Bob Monkhouse, is broadcast on ITV, although it would be revived briefly in 2014 and 2015. 
5 January – The network television premiere of Jim Sheridan's 1993 biographical drama In the Name of the Father on BBC2, starring Daniel Day-Lewis, Pete Postlethwaite and Emma Thompson.
6 January – Channel 4 closes down for the last time with 24-hour transmissions commencing at 6am the following day. Consequently, after nearly 15 years on the air, 4-Tel On View ends.
7 January – Carlton presents Monarchy: The Nation Decides, a live studio debate discussing the future of the monarchy in the UK. Viewers were encouraged to vote on the issue in what is the UK's largest television phone poll. However, Carlton is forced to extend the deadline for calls following complaints from people unable to get through. Of the 2.6million callers who vote, 66% are in favour of retaining a monarch while 34% are against.
8 January – The serialised children's series The Wild House makes its debut on BBC1.
9 January – BT releases an advert featuring Letitia Dean and nine other former EastEnders stars in its Friends and Family promotion despite the BBC threatening them with legal action. The BBC subsequently withdraws its threat to sue after BT pays them an undisclosed five-figure amount.
14 January – Viewing figures released for 1996 indicate that BBC1 and BBC2 as the only terrestrial channels to increase their audience share during the year.
29 January – Debut of the spoof documentary series Brass Eye on Channel 4. 
31 January 
The Independent Television Commission receives two applications for the licence to operate digital terrestrial television in the UK. They come from British Digital Broadcasting (BDB), a joint venture between Carlton, Granada and British Sky Broadcasting (BSkyB) and from Digital Television Network (DTN), a company created by cable operator CableTel, later known as NTL.
Details of Channel 5's schedule are leaked to Broadcast magazine. A spokeswoman for the channel confirms the schedule is largely accurate but that the amount of imported content has been distorted, Channel 5's schedule will be made up of 70% UK-produced content.

February
3 February 
Trouble launches, broadcasting programming aimed at teenagers and young adults. It shares space with Bravo whose broadcasting hours change to 8pm to 6am.
The Family Channel relaunches as a game show channel called Challenge TV, although Family Late continues to broadcast as an overnight programming block.
Pre-school programmes block Tiny TCC which aired every morning from 6am until 9am is transferred to UK Living and is renamed Tiny Living with its airtime being changed to 7am to 9am on weekdays and 7am to 10am during the weekend.
5 February – The first Wednesday edition of the National Lottery is broadcast on BBC1 with the introduction of a second weekly draw.
5 February – Debut of the comedy sketch series Armstrong and Miller on the Paramount Comedy Channel and later on Channel 4, starring Alexander Armstrong and Ben Miller. 
9 February – The live final of the 1997 Masters on BBC2 is interrupted by snooker's first ever streaker, 22-year-old secretary Lianne Crofts who invaded the playing area at the beginning of the third frame. After stewards removed her from the arena, Ronnie O'Sullivan amused the crowd by comically wiping the brow of veteran referee John Street who was refereeing his final match of his career.
12 February – Channel 5 releases details of its programme scheduling. It will introduce the concept of stripping and stranding to British television, stripping being where a programme is shown at the same time each day and stranding being where similar programmes are shown at the same time each day. A full schedule is published on 18 February.
14 February – The cable-only entertainment channel Carlton Select replaces SelecTV which it acquired when Carlton bought Pearson Television.
15 February – The Simpsons is shown for the last time on BBC1 with the episode Two Cars in Every Garage and Three Eyes on Every Fish. 
19 February – Ceefax ceases to provide information on Channel 5 test transmissions.
24 February – The final episode of the sitcom The Brittas Empire is broadcast on BBC1. 
28 February – The BBC sells its transmitters and transmission services to Castle Transmission Services for £244 million to help fund its plans for the digital age.
February – The Paramount Channel relaunches as the Paramount Comedy Channel, a channel dedicated solely to comedy. Previously, the channel had aired drama alongside its comedy output.

March
3 March – Dave Spikey becomes the sixth host for the final series of the ITV weekday morning game show Chain Letters in the same year as its 10th anniversary.
4 March – The BBC and Flextech agree on a deal to provide BBC-branded channels. BBC Showcase, for entertainment, BBC Horizon, for documentaries, BBC Style, for lifestyle programming, BBC Learning, for schools and BBC Arena, for the arts plus three other channels: BBC Catch-Up, for repeats of popular programmes within days of their original broadcast, a dedicated BBC Sport channel and a TV version of Radio 1.
8 March – ITV takes over the UK television rights to Formula One after 18 years of coverage on the BBC. It shows full coverage of qualifying as well as the race itself, something that the BBC generally did not do.
10 March – The Simpsons is moved from BBC1 to BBC2 and is shown between Monday and Friday at 6pm. 
14 March – Among the highlights of that year's Comic Relief telethon is Prime Cracker, a short spoof crossover of ITV stablemate crime dramas Prime Suspect and Cracker, starring Helen Mirren and Robbie Coltrane as their respective characters.
18 March – The final episode of Come Outside is broadcast on BBC2. 
21 March – Campaign magazine reports that the BBC and Flextech have ratified their joint venture. They will create two new operational ventures, one that will develop and launch subscription channels in the UK and Ireland and one that will acquire and run UK Gold.
23 March 
The science documentary The Language Master makes its debut on BBC2 in which language teacher Michel Thomas taught French to sixth form students for five days at a further education college in London. As a result of the interest generated by this documentary, the publisher Hodder & Stoughton commissioned Thomas to produce commercial versions of his courses.
Debut of the long-running crime drama Midsomer Murders on ITV. 
25 March – ITV's Network First strand presents a ground-breaking documentary about Edinburgh's Royal Blind School, a boarding school for visually impaired students.
26 March – The network television premiere of Alan J. Pakula's 1993 American thriller The Pelican Brief on ITV, based on John Grisham's novel of the same name starring Julia Roberts and Denzel Washington.
28 March – The final episode of the children's series Playdays is broadcast on BBC2. 
30 March 
Channel 5, the UK's fifth and last analogue terrestrial channel, launches at 6pm. The first faces seen are the Spice Girls who perform 1-2-3-4-5, a rewritten version of Manfred Mann's 1964 song 5-4-3-2-1. The opening night's highlights include the launch of a new daily soap Family Affairs and The Jack Docherty Show, a weeknight chat show based on the format of American shows such as The Late Show with David Letterman.
Sky1 airs The Springfield Files, a crossover episode of The Simpsons with The X-Files, featuring the guest voices of David Duchovny and Gillian Anderson as FBI agents Fox Mulder and Dana Scully, as well as Star Treks Leonard Nimoy who appears as himself to feature numerous references of the series.
ITV airs the comedy pilot Cold Feet. It returns for a full series the following year and runs until 2003.
31 March 
The hugely popular children's series Teletubbies makes its debut on BBC2.
The game show Blockbusters relaunches on BBC2, presented by Michael Aspel. This is the only version featuring adult contestants and purple hexagons while retaining the same format. The series continues until 28 August.
BBC1 airs a made-for-television version of Michael Flatley's musical Lord of the Dance. The programme is shown on the same evening that Channel 4 airs a relaunched version of Riverdance featuring Colin Dunne and Jean Butler.
Channel 5 becomes the subject of a ratings war with all major channels adopting aggressive scheduling to retain viewers. As well as Lord of the Dance, BBC1 airs two episodes of EastEnders and the thriller Malice, while ITV screens five films, including Ace Ventura: Pet Detective and RoboCop 2. Channel 4 has the films The Goodbye Girl and Breakheart Pass.
The inaugural edition of 5 News features an interview with Labour Party leader Tony Blair.
Among the new shows that made their debut on Channel 5 that day include the game shows 100% and Whittle as well as Hot Property and the children's programming block Milkshake!. 
Debut of BBC World's flagship interview series HARDtalk.

April
1 April 
At 4:40am, Channel 5 begins a rerun of the Australian soap Prisoner: Cell Block H. This is the series first networked broadcast in the UK as during its earlier run on ITV, scheduling of the show had varied from region to region.
Quincy, a series that was previously shown on ITV, begins airing on BBC1 as part of the their daytime schedule.
3 April 
BBC1 airs Episode 2710 of Neighbours in which the character Cheryl Stark, played by Caroline Gillmer, is killed off when she is hit by a vehicle while trying to cross a road to save her daughter. Scenes involving the accident are censored by the BBC before the episode is broadcast. Five seconds of the episode had also been cut before it aired in Australia in September 1996.
Postman Pat returns for a new series of 13 episodes on BBC1, copyrighted the previous year. Two special episodes were aired two and a half years prior to making another 15 episodes in total.
The Learning Channel is renamed Discovery Home & Leisure.
5 April 
The 1997 Grand National is delayed after a suspected Provisional IRA  bomb threat. The race is eventually run on 7 April at 5pm. It was the last of 50 Nationals, including the void race of 1993 to be commentated by Peter O'Sullevan.
Debut of the music game show Night Fever on Channel 5, presented by Suggs. 
Debut of the game show Whatever You Want on BBC1, presented by Gaby Roslin.
5–6 April – BBC1 airs a two-part adaptation of The Ice House, the debut novel of crime writer Minette Walters. The miniseries stars Daniel Craig, Corin Redgrave, Kitty Aldridge and Frances Barber.
6 April 
The network television premiere of Mrs. Doubtfire on Channel 5, starring Robin Williams.
Debut of the drama series Where the Heart Is on ITV. 
7 April 
Peter Baldwin makes his final appearance as popular character Derek Wilton in Coronation Street, having appeared on and off since 1976 with Derek dying of a heart attack following a road rage incident. The character was axed in a high-profile cull by producer Brian Park.
Debut of the children's game show 50/50 on BBC1, presented by Sally Gray. 
8 April 
BBC journalist Martin Bell announces that he is to stand as a candidate against Neil Hamilton in the Tatton constituency on an anti-corruption platform.
The American/Canadian children's animated series Arthur makes its UK debut on BBC1.
12 April – The final edition of the game show You Bet! is broadcast on ITV after 9 years on the air.
13 April – The network television premiere of Brian Gibson's 1993 biographical drama What's Love Got to Do with It on Channel 4, based on the life of the legendary American singer Tina Turner and stars Angela Bassett, Laurence Fishburne and Vanessa Bell Calloway.
14 April – June Brown returns to EastEnders as Dot Cotton after a four-year break. 
15 April – The Bookmark documentary film The Thomas the Tank Engine Man airs on BBC2 again as a tribute to the author and creator of The Railway Series and Thomas the Tank Engine & Friends The Rev. W. Awdry who died in his home in Stroud, Gloucestershire after being bedridden and suffering from health problems on 21 March. 
16 April – The network television premiere of The Fugitive on ITV, starring Harrison Ford and Tommy Lee Jones.
25 April – The final edition of the daytime game show Chain Letters is broadcast on ITV after 10 years on the air.
27 April – The BBC confirms that the comedy duo Hale and Pace have signed a £1 million two-year deal that will see them move from ITV.

May
1 May – General Election night: for the first time, the brothers David and Jonathan Dimbleby anchor rival results programmes on BBC1 and ITV, respectively. The same arrangement will occur for the General Elections in 2001 and 2005.
2 May – The network television premiere of Falling Down on BBC1, a 1993 American action thriller starring Michael Douglas, Robert Duvall and Barbara Hershey.
3 May – Katrina and the Waves win the Eurovision Song Contest with the song Love Shine a Light, the first time the UK has won the competition since 1981. 
10 May – Debut of the crime mystery series Jonathan Creek on BBC1, starring Alan Davies as the titular character. 
13 May – Jeremy Paxman speaks to Michael Howard on Newsnight on BBC2 and the interview becomes the programme's most notorious. Howard who had been Home Secretary until thirteen days earlier, had held a meeting with Derek Lewis, head of the Prison Service about the possible dismissal of the governor of Parkhurst Prison, John Marriott. Howard, having given evasive answers, was asked by Paxman the same question, "Did you threaten to overrule him (Lewis)?", a total of twelve times in succession, 14 if the first two inquiries worded somewhat differently and some time before the succession of 12 are included. Howard did not give a direct answer, instead repeatedly saying that he "did not overrule him" and ignoring the "threaten" part of the question. Howard finally answered Paxman's question on his final edition of Newsnight in 2014, saying "No Jeremy, I didn't. But feel free to ask another eleven times."
21 May – Serena Martin wins the 1997 series of Junior MasterChef on BBC1. 
23 May – The long-running Channel 4 game show Countdown celebrates its 2000th edition with a special retrospective programme.
24–26 May – Channel 4 dedicates the Spring Bank Holiday weekend to sitcoms. It features classic episodes, 1970s spin-off films and documentaries about the genre's appeal.
25 May – The network television premiere of John Waters 1994 black comedy Serial Mom on Channel 4, starring Kathleen Turner, Sam Waterston and Ricki Lake.
26 May – BBC1 airs the documentary Lenny's Big Amazon Adventure which sees Lenny Henry travel to Peru with survival expert Lofty Wiseman.
30 May 
The network television premiere of Russell Mulcahy's 1993 crime caper The Real McCoy on Channel 5, starring Kim Basinger, Val Kilmer and Terence Stamp.
ITV airs a one-off special programme Kids Behaving Badly, Richard Madeley and Judy Finnigan present a live debate spotlighting lawlessness among Britain's youth with video evidence of juvenile crime and live links to troubled areas.
The network television premiere of Carl Reiner's 1993 spoof erotic thriller Fatal Instinct on BBC1, starring Armand Assante, Sherilyn Fenn, Kate Nelligan and Sean Young.
31 May 
Michael Grade steps down from the role of Chief Executive of Channel 4. He is succeeded by Michael Jackson who takes over the following day.
Channel 5 airs its first international football coverage, a match between England and Poland. The channel experiments with a new presenting format which tries to recreate the atmosphere of a bar with presenters supplying coverage against the backdrop of chatter from an invited audience. The format draws criticism with The Independent's Glenn Moore describing it as a "shambles" However, the coverage gives the channel its largest audience so far with a viewership of five million.

June
2 June – BBC Breakfast News is given a revamp. Its studio and theme tune changes. It is now known as Breakfast News, rather than BBC Breakfast News. 
4 June – Magdalen College, Oxford wins the 1996–97 series of University Challenge on BBC2, beating The Open University 250–195.
7 June – Debut of the dating game show The Other Half on BBC1, presented by Dale Winton. 
8 June 
The last football match commentated by Jock Brown for BBC Scotland which was a World Cup Qualifier when Scotland played away to Belarus to win 1–0. He leaves the station at the end of the month to take a role as general manager at Celtic F.C.
Faye Dempsey wins the eighth series of Stars in Their Eyes on ITV, performing as Olivia Newton-John. 
10 June 
BBC2 airs the documentary Homeground: An Exile's Return, telling the story of Martin McGartland, a former British agent who infiltrated the Provisional Irish Republican Army.
Debut of the docusoap Driving School on BBC1. 
11 June – SMG buys Grampian Television, the ITV contractor for Northern Scotland for £105 million.
18 June – The final episode of the supernatural soap Springhill is broadcast on Sky1. 
19 June – Media agencies reject Granada Group chairman Gerry Robinson's call for the formation of a single ITV company, expressing concerns it would be extremely damaging to advertisers.
25 June – The Independent Television Commission award the sole digital terrestrial television broadcast licence to British Digital Broadcasting.
26 June – Yorkshire-Tyne Tees Television plc is acquired by Granada Group plc.
30 June – BBC1 airs a day of coverage of the Hong Kong handover ceremony, marking the transfer of sovereignty over Hong Kong from the United Kingdom to China, an event that happens at midnight local time, 5pm in the UK.

July
1 July – MTV launches on all satellite and cable platforms in the UK and Ireland. It replaces the pan-European service and is part of a strategy which sees localised MTV channels launch across Europe.
3 July – After 17 years, Peter Snow presents Newsnight for the last time, although he will continue to make occasional appearances as a political analyst until 2005.
4 July – The Battersby family, described by the media as a "family from hell", make their debut in Coronation Street.
5 July – ITV airs the comedy pilot The Grimleys. A full series begins in 1999 and runs until 2001.
11 July – Debut of Celebrity Ready Steady Cook on BBC1, presented by Fern Britton. 
12 July 
The network television premiere of John Woo's 1993 action thriller Hard Target on BBC1, starring Jean-Claude Van Damme.
The US fantasy series Xena: Warrior Princess makes its UK debut on Channel 5, starring Lucy Lawless as the titular character. 
14 July – Debut of the ...from Hell documentary series on ITV. 
18 July – The network television premiere of Bernard Rose's 1992 American horror Candyman on Channel 4, starring Virginia Madsen, Tony Todd, Xander Berkeley, Kasi Lemmons and Vanessa Williams.
25 July  
Channel 5 announces plans to run an advertising campaign on ITV in order to attract more viewers.
The network television premiere of Clive Barker's 1987 supernatural horror Hellraiser on Channel 4, starring Andrew Robinson, Clare Higgins, Ashley Laurence and Doug Bradley.
26 July – Midlands Today presenter Alan Towers announces live on air that he is leaving the programme after 25 years in broadcast journalism, describing BBC bosses as "pygmies in grey suits wearing blindfolds".

August
1 August – The US animated series King of the Hill makes its UK debut on Channel 4. 
3 August – Julie Friend wins the 1997 series of MasterChef on BBC1. 
7 August – The final episode of This Life is broadcast on BBC2. 
8 August – The children's animated series Postman Pat has been snapped up by Premiere 12 for broadcasting in Singapore.
24 August – Sky1 airs a special episode of The Simpsons, in which Troy McClure introduces three spin-off segments include references to many different television series, as well as American comedian and actor Tim Conway makes its guest appearance as himself.
26 August 
It is reported that former Grandstand presenter Helen Rollason has been diagnosed with cancer and will undergo emergency surgery.
Debut of the fly-on-the-wall documentary series Vets in Practice on BBC1. 
31 August 
Sky2 and Granada Talk TV both cease broadcasting.
BBC1 stays on the air throughout the night, simulcasting with BBC World News to bring updates of Diana, Princess of Wales's car accident and death. At 6am, a rolling news programme, anchored by Martyn Lewis and from 1pm by Peter Sissons, is shown on both BBC1 and BBC2 until the latter breaks away at 3pm to provide alternative programming. BBC1 continues to provide coverage until closedown when it once again hands over to BBC World News. ITV's unbroken news coverage of the tragedy lasts until well into the evening with the first scheduled programme being Coronation Street. In the days following her death, regular programming is abandoned in order to allow for coverage of events.

September
1–5 September – Extended news bulletins and additional programmes are broadcast all week to keep viewers up to date on the aftermath of the death of Diana, Princess of Wales.
1 September 
The National Geographic Channel is launched. It is an evening-only service, on air each night from 7.00pm until 1.00am.
Channel 5's The Jack Docherty Show returns after the summer break with a relaunch which includes new music and titles. The Friday edition is also dropped at Docherty's suggestion, ending the original five-nights-a-week format.
Magnus Magnusson hosts his final episode of Mastermind on BBC1. John Humphrys would succeed him upon its return in 2003.
5 September 
Queen Elizabeth II addresses the nation with a special broadcast in which she pays tribute to Diana, Princess of Wales, only the second time she has done so. The address is broadcast live at 6.00pm, ahead of the early evening news broadcasts.
The former ITV game show Name That Tune returns for a new series on Channel 5, presented by Jools Holland.
6 September – The live broadcast of the funeral of Diana, Princess of Wales is watched by 2.5 billion viewers worldwide. The ceremony's footage goes down in the Guinness World Records as the biggest TV audience for a live broadcast. In the UK, 32.10 million viewers watch the broadcast. It is the UK's second most-watched broadcast of all time, behind 1966's World Cup final.
9 September – The network television premiere of the 1993 American crime drama A Perfect World on ITV, starring Kevin Costner, Clint Eastwood and Laura Dern.
10 September – BBC2 begins showing the six-part documentary series The Nazis: A Warning from History which examines the rise and fall of the Nazi Party in Germany. The final part is aired on 15 October.
11 September – The US sitcom Suddenly Susan makes its UK debut on Sky1, starring Brooke Shields. 
13 September – The network television premiere of the 1991 American romantic drama The Prince of Tides on ITV, starring Barbra Streisand and Nick Nolte.
14 September – Gumby: The Movie is broadcast on The Disney Channel, marking the only time Gumby is aired in the UK. 
16 September 
The BBC announces a radical shake-up of news and current affairs programming that will see television and radio news services produced by the same production teams.
BBC1 airs the documentary series Holiday Memories in which presenter Esther Rantzen revisits Zimbabwe with her daughter. She became severely ill after filming the episode and was subsequently diagnosed with Giardiasis. She is absent from her BBC2 afternoon talk show Esther for a few months while recovering from the condition, returning to television in early 1998.
19 September – Debut of the garden makeover series Ground Force on BBC2, presented by Alan Titchmarsh, Charlie Dimmock and Tommy Walsh. 
20 September – Debut of the BBC promotional film featuring a version of Lou Reed's 1972 song Perfect Day performed by various artists including David Bowie, Bono, Brett Anderson and Laurie Anderson. Due to its popularity, the version is released as a single on 17 November with sales benefiting Children in Need. The song ultimately spends three weeks at the top of the UK Singles Chart and raises £2,125,000 for Children in Need. By November 2016, it has sold 1.54 million copies, despite not being available for download.
22–25 September – EastEnders airs a series of episodes from Ireland which attract criticism from viewers and the Irish embassy because of their negative and stereotypical portrayal of Irish people. The BBC later issues an apology for any offence the episodes caused.
29 September – Two new children's animated series, The Enchanted Lands, based on the book series The Faraway Tree and The Wishing Chair by Enid Blyton and Noah's Island, made by Telemagination, the company behind The Animals of Farthing Wood both make their debuts on BBC1. Both of the series first aired in Ireland, prior to airing in their homeland.

October
3 October – The 'Virtual Globe' ident is seen for the final time on BBC1 after six years in use. 
4 October – BBC One launches its new hot air balloon globe idents to coincide with the introduction of the network's new corporate logo. Also on that day, new idents feature on BBC Two alongside the existing one's first seen in 1991 with the new logo.
14 October – Debut of the football-based drama series Dream Team on Sky1. 
16 October – Emmerdale celebrates its 25th anniversary.
19 October 
 The network television premiere of Steven Spielberg's 1993 Oscar-winning drama Schindler's List on BBC One, based on the novel Schindler's Ark by Thomas Keneally starring Liam Neeson, Ben Kingsley and Ralph Fiennes. The film is followed by an interview with Spielberg and a profile of Oskar Schindler.
 Debut of Lynda La Plante's police procedural series Trial & Retribution on ITV which makes frequent use of the split-screen format.
27 October – UK Living changes its name to Living TV to distance itself from the forthcoming UKTV network.
30 October – BBC One airs Clive Anderson's infamous interview with the Bee Gees which ends with them storming out of the studio. He repeatedly jokes about their life and career throughout the interview, but they decide to leave after he refers to them as "tossers".
31 October – Queen Elizabeth II opens a £5.5 million interactive visitors centre, the BBC Experience at Broadcasting House. The venture proved to be loss-making for the corporation and was closed in 2001.

November
1 November 
The UKTV network is launched. Existing channel UK Gold is joined by UK Horizons, UK Arena and UK Style. The channels' full broadcast hours are only available on cable due to limited capacity on satellite.
The Movie Channel is rebranded under the Sky Movies banner, now called Sky Movies Screen 1 and Sky Movies Screen 2.
2 November – The network television premiere of Quentin Tarantino's critically acclaimed film Pulp Fiction on BBC Two, starring John Travolta, Samuel L. Jackson, Bruce Willis and Uma Thurman.
3 November – Debut of the sitcom I'm Alan Partridge on BBC Two, starring Steve Coogan. 
4 November – BBC News Online is launched.
9 November – At 6pm, BBC News 24 is launched, but only on cable. It is the BBC's first new channel since BBC Two in 1964. It also broadcasts on BBC One through the night after closedown.
12 November – The network television premiere of In the Line of Fire on ITV, starring Clint Eastwood.
20 November – BBC One airs live coverage of the service of thanksgiving marking the golden wedding of Queen Elizabeth II and Prince Philip, held at Westminster Abbey.
21 November – For the first time, Children in Need has its own website which is launched at 4pm ahead of the evening's telethon on BBC One.
26 November – The network television premiere of Trainspotting on Channel 4, starring Ewan McGregor.

December
1 December 
Sky Box Office is relaunched with four movies-on-demand channels. 
Konnie Huq presents her first episode of the long-running children's series Blue Peter on BBC One. She will go on to be the longest-running female presenter and the third longest overall in the show's history, presenting for ten years before leaving in January 2008.
5 December – The Canadian/German science-fiction series Lexx makes its UK debut on Channel 5.
7 December 
The Teletubbies, the characters from the BBC children's series which first went on the air at the end of March, are at number one in the UK Singles Chart with their debut single Teletubbies say "Eh-oh!". The track is a contender for the coveted Christmas number one, but that title is taken by the Spice Girls with Too Much.
Jeremy Beadle presents his final edition of You've Been Framed! on ITV. 
9 December 
CNBC Europe announces its intention to merge with the Dow Jones news channel in Europe, European Business News.
The final episode of Soldier Soldier is broadcast on ITV. 
14 December – The US/Canadian science-fiction series Earth: Final Conflict makes its UK debut on Sky One. 
20 December – The ITC award the three pay-TV digital multiplex licences to British Digital Broadcasting.
24 December 
Christmas Eve highlights on BBC One include Naked Gun : The Final Insult, starring Leslie Nielsen.
Christmas Eve highlights on Channel 5 include Tim Vine's Christmas Present, an Andy Williams Show-style programme of festive music and guests.
25 December – Christmas Day highlights on BBC One include the network television premieres of The Flintstones starring John Goodman and Elizabeth Taylor and The Mask starring Jim Carrey.
26 December 
Boxing Day highlights on BBC One include the films Hook starring Dustin Hoffman and Robin Williams, Beethoven's 2nd starring Charles Grodin and True Lies starring Arnold Schwarzenegger and Jamie Lee Curtis, as well as Paul McCartney's Standing Stones, the Documentary and Unplugged: Oasis.
After a seven-year absence, the game show Blankety Blank returns to BBC One, presented by Lily Savage. 
The network television premiere of Nell on Channel 4, starring Jodie Foster, Liam Neeson and Natasha Richardson. 
27 December – Channel 4 airs an evening of programmes chosen by its viewers. The line-up includes episodes of Brookside, Friends, Father Ted, Cutting Edge and Whose Line is it Anyway?, as well as the film Shallow Grave starring Ewan McGregor.
28 December – BBC One airs a two-part adaptation of The Woman in White, based on the novel of the same name. The second part is shown the following day. 
29 December – The final episode of Talking Telephone Numbers is broadcast on ITV. 
31 December – BBC One airs Cold Enough for Snow, the sequel to Jack Rosenthal's 1996 comedy Eskimo Day.
 December – The first series of Robot Wars is filmed from December of that year to January of the following year with the first episode airing on 20 February 1998.

Unknown
Michael Jackson is appointed Chief Executive of Channel 4.
Chris Smith, the Secretary of State for Culture, Media and Sport, announces that Channel 4's funding formula with ITV will be abolished from 1998.

Debuts

BBC1/One
1 January – The Mill on the Floss (1997)
6 January – Gadget Boy & Heather (1995–1998)
7 January 
The Prince of Atlantis (1997)
Hububb (1997–2001)
8 January – The Wild House (1997–1999)
12 January – Ivanhoe (1997)
16 January – Ramadan Journeys (1997)
19 February – Insiders (1997)
20 February – Chalk (1997)
27 February – A Perfect State (1997)
1 March – Crime Traveller (1997)
15 March – Have Your Cake and Eat It (1997)
16 March – True Tilda (1997)
29 March – The Missing Postman (1997)
3 April – No Sweat (1997–1998)
5 April 
The Ice House (1997)
Whatever You Want (1997–2000)
7 April – 50/50 (1997–2005)
8 April – Arthur (1996–2021)
17 April – Keeping Mum (1997–1998)
22 April – Breakout (1997)
4 May – The Heart Surgeon (1997)
10 May – Jonathan Creek (1997–2004, 2009–2016)
18 May – Plotlands (1997)
20 May – Plasmo (1997)
25 May – Born to Run (1997)
30 May – Drovers' Gold (1997)
7 June – The Other Half (1997–2002)
10 June – Driving School (1997)
17 June – The Broker's Man (1997–1998)
11 July – Celebrity Ready Steady Cook (1997–2003)
21 July 
 Match of the Eighties (1997)
 Tiger Bay (1997)
31 July – Pilgrim's Rest (1997)
24 August – The Beggar Bride (1997)
26 August – Vets in Practice (1997–2002)
31 August – Full Circle with Michael Palin (1997)
1 September – Bloomin' Marvellous (1997)
14 September – The Lakes (1997, 1999)
15 September – A Prince Among Men (1997–1998)
25 September 
 Dad (1997–1999)
 The Locksmith (1997)
29 September 
 Enid Blyton's Enchanted Lands (1997–1998)
 Noah's Island (1997–1999)
4 October – The Fix (1997)
11 October – Bright Hair (1997)
2 November – Get Well Soon (1997)
3 November – Hotel (1997)
9 November – The History of Tom Jones: A Foundling (1997)
10 November – Spark (1997)
16 November – The Phoenix and the Carpet (1997)
29 November – The Student Prince (1997)
2 December – Aquila (1997–1998)
28 December – The Woman in White (1997)
31 December – Cold Enough For Snow (1997)

BBC2/Two
7 January – Grown Ups (1997)
1 February – Nostromo (1997)
21 February – Birding with Bill Oddie (1997–2000)
24 February – Ray Mears' World of Survival (1997–1998)
31 March – Teletubbies (1997–2001, 2002, 2007, 2012, 2015–2018)
14 April – Look and Read: Captain Crimson (1997)
18 April – Sunnyside Farm (1997)
1 June – The Magical Adventures of Quasimodo (1996)
2 September – Holding On (1997)
5 September – VR.5 (1995)
10 September – The Nazis: A Warning from History (1997)
19 September – Ground Force (1997–2005)
4 October – Clive Barker's A-Z of Horror (1997–1998)
28 October – Back to the Floor (1997–2002)
3 November – I'm Alan Partridge (1997–2002)
9 November – Profit (1996)
17 November – Land of the Tiger (1997)
7 December – Love Bites (3 single dramas – Bumping the Odds, In Your Dreams and The Perfect Blue) (1997)
22 December – Stella Street (1997–2001)
28 December – Mothertime (1997)
29 December – Operation Good Guys (1997–2000)

BBC News 24
31 March – HARDtalk (1997–present)
9 November – BBC World News (1991–present)

ITV
4 January – Goodbye, My Love (1997)
5 January – Rebecca (1997)
6 January 
 Sooty's Amazing Adventures (1997–1998)
 Adam's Family Tree (1997–1999)
7 January – Quayside (1997)
8 January – The Blobs (1997–1998)
12 January – The Wingless Bird (1997)
18 January – The Place of the Dead (1997)
24 January – Holding the Baby (1997–1998)
5 February – Supply & Demand (1997–1998)
6 February – Reckless (1997)
25 February – No Child of Mine (1997)
26 February – Dr. Xargle (1997–1998)
27 February – Snap (1997–1999)
28 February 
 Slim Pig (1996–2005)
 The Moth (1997)
8 March – Formula One coverage on ITV (1997–2008)
9 March – Jane Eyre (1997)
20 March – PD James' Original Sin (1997)
23 March – Midsomer Murders (1997–present)
30 March 
 Cold Feet (1997–2003, 2016–present)
 Comedy Premieres (1997)
2 April – The Vanishing Man (1997–1998)
4 April – The Grand (1997–1998)
6 April – Where the Heart Is (1997–2006)
29 April – Touching Evil (1997–1999)
9 May – See You Friday (1997)
18 May – Wokenwell (1997)
4 June – Wavelength (1997–1998)
6 June – The Man Who Made Husbands Jealous (1997)
25 June – Animal Shelf (1997–2000)
8 July – Captain Star (1997–1998)
14 July – ...from Hell (1997–2010)
28 July – Ain't Misbehavin' (1997)
30 August – Tricky (1997)
2 September – Knight School (1997–1998)
4 September – The Adventures of Paddington Bear (1997–2000)
5 September – Kipper (1997–2000)
8 September – Noah's Ark (1997–1998)
25 September – The Uninvited (1997)
26 September – Titch (1997–2001)
3 October – Rag Nymph (1997)
15 October – Into the Blue (1997)
19 October – Trial & Retribution (1997–2009)
24 October – An Unsuitable Job for a Woman (1997–2001)
14 November – Bernard's Watch (1997–2005)
18 November – Savage Earth (1997)
21 November – Blind Men (1997–1998)
7 December – Painted Lady (1997)
23 December – The Pale Horse (1997)
24 December – The Black Velvet Band (1997)

Channel 4
3 January – Captain Butler (1997)
13 January – Collectors' Lot (1997–2001)
25 January – Last Chance Lottery (1997)
27 January – Pet Rescue (1997–2003)
29 January 
 Brass Eye (1997–2001)
 Fortean TV (1997–1998)
1 February – The Show (1997)
17 February – Under The Moon (1997–1998)
24 March – Light Lunch (1997–1999)
7 April – Armstrong and Miller (1997–2001)
 12 May 
 Melissa (1997)
 Soul Music (1997)
30 May – Harry Hill (1997–2003)
15 July – Space Cadets (1997)
1 August – King of the Hill (1997–2010)
9 October – A Dance to the Music of Time (1997)
31 October – TV Offal (1997–1998)
4 November – Underworld (1997)
Unknown – The Investigator (1997)

S4C
 Unknown 
 Y Clwb Rygbi (1997–present)
 Ffermio (1997–present)

Channel 5
30 March 
 Family Affairs (1997–2005)
 The Jack Docherty Show (1997–1999)
31 March 
 100% (1997–2001)
 Whittle (1997–1998)
 5 News (1997–present)
 Hot Property (1997–1998, 2001–2003)
 Havakazoo (1997–2002)
 Milkshake! (1997–present) 
3 April – Bring Me the Head of Light Entertainment (1997–2000)
4 April – MLB on Five (1997–2008)
5 April – Night Fever (1997–2002)
12 April – Wimzie's House (1995–1996)
May – Football on 5 (1997–2012, 2015–present)
12 July – Xena: Warrior Princess (1995–2001)
5 September – Name That Tune (1997–1998)
22 September – Wing and a Prayer (1997–1999)
5 December – Lexx (1997–2002)

Disney Channel UK
1 September – Studio Disney UK (1997–2005)

Sky 1/One
14 October – Dream Team (1997–2007)

Paramount Comedy Channel
5 February – Armstrong and Miller (1997–1999)

Channels
New channels

Defunct channels

Rebranded channels

Television shows
Changes of network affiliation

Returning this year after a break of one year or longer
 Captain Pugwash (1957–1975 BBC, 1997–2002 ITV)
 Sale of the Century (1971–1983 ITV, 1989–1991 Sky One, 1997 Challenge)
 Birds of a Feather (1989–1994,1997–1998, 2014–2020)
 Blankety Blank (1979–1990, 1997–2002)
 Blockbusters (1983–1993 ITV, 1994–1995 Sky One, 1997 BBC Two, 2000–2001 Sky One, 2012 Challenge, 2019 Comedy Central)

Ending this yearThe Woody Woodpecker Show (1957–1997)Sportsnight (1965–1997)Rainbow (1972–1992, 1994–1997)Celebrity Squares (1975–1979, 1993–1997, 2014–2015)Give Us a Clue (1979–1997)Postman Pat (1981, 1991–1994, 1996, 2004–2008)Chain Letters (1987–1997)You Bet! (1988–1997)Playdays (1988–1997)The Brittas Empire (1991–1997)Soldier Soldier (1991–1997)Come Outside (1993–1997)Talking Telephone Numbers (1994–1997)All Quiet on the Preston Front (1994–1997)Pie in the Sky (1994–1997)Oh, Doctor Beeching! (1995–1997)Paul Merton in Galton & Simpson's... (1996–1997)This Life (1996–1997)All Rise for Julian Clary (1996–1997)The Big Big Talent Show (1996–1997)Have Your Cake and Eat It (1997)PlotlandsThe Man Who Made Husbands Jealous (1997)Holding On (1997)Hotel (1997)The Prince of Atlantis (1997)The History of Tom Jones (1997)Mastermind'' (1972–1997, 2003–present)

Births
2 February – Ellie Bamber, actress
1 April – Asa Butterfield, actor
15 April – Maisie Williams, actress
3 July – Mia McKenna-Bruce, actress 
16 August – Tilly Keeper, actress 
25 August – Holly Gibbs, actress
7 September – Dean-Charles Chapman, actor
16 September – Amy-Leigh Hickman, actress

Deaths

See also
 1997 in British music
 1997 in British radio
 1997 in the United Kingdom
 List of British films of 1997

References